Anxhelina Hadërgjonaj (born 2 December 1993), also known mononymously as Anxhelina, is an Albanian-American singer, fashion blogger and influencer.

Life and career

1993–present: Early life and continued success 

Anxhelina Hadërgjonaj was born on 2 December 1993  in Los Angeles, California to Albanian parents Mentor and Albërie Hadërgjonaj, originally from Kosovo. Hadërgjonaj commenced her early forays into the music industry in 2010 with the releases of "Kopje pa kuptim" and in the following year with "Kjo jetë s'mjaftoi". After nine years, in December 2020, she released her comeback single 'Precious', which achieved modest success, reaching the top 10 in Albania. Her chart success followed into 2021 with the follow-up single, "No Drama", peaking at number 10 in Albania.

Artistry 

Hadërgjonaj's music style has been regarded as pop and R&B. She has expressed her desire to collaborate with Billie Eilish, Dua Lipa, SZA and Drake.

Discography

Singles

References 

1993 births
21st-century Albanian women singers
21st-century American women singers
21st-century American singers
Albanian bloggers
Albanian women bloggers
Albanian Internet celebrities
Albanian-language singers
Albanian people of Kosovan descent
American Internet celebrities
American people of Albanian descent
American people of Kosovan descent
English-language singers from Albania
Living people
Musicians from Los Angeles
Musicians from Tirana